Whoopi's Littleburg is a musical miniseries of three specials produced for Nickelodeon's Nick Jr. block. It was created by Jonny Belt and Robert Scull, the latter of whom co-directed the show along with Tim Hill. The show uses a blend of puppetry and live-action characters.

The miniseries focuses on a five-year-old piglet named Spencer, who has recently moved to the town of Littleburg. Young children and puppets make up the majority of the population and hold the community's jobs, and very few adult characters are seen. The only major adult characters are Spencer's mother and Mayor Whoopi (portrayed by Whoopi Goldberg), whose behavior resembles that of a preschool teacher. The setting was modeled after a nursery school classroom. Multiple original songs are woven into each story, normally in conjunction with the episode's moral. Whoopi Goldberg, Dr. John, and Guy Davis composed the theme music.

Characters

Main
Spencer Piggle (voiced by Sean Curley and performed by Josh Gustin) is a light-pink pig and the newest Littleburg citizen. He is five years old.
Mayor Whoopi (played by Whoopi Goldberg) is Spencer's tour guide around Littleburg, and the only major human character in the series.
TJ/Tiger Jane (performed by Sofie Zamchick) is a light-purple cat who is Spencer's closest friend. She is six years old.
Mrs. Peg Piggle (performed by Mary Birdsong) is Spencer's mother, who teaches him about the town through song.
Peggy Piggle is Spencer's baby sister.
The Sun (voiced by Dr. John) is an anthropomorphic Sun (who can set and become the Moon at night) seen above Littleburg.
Phil is a horse with a love of painting. He is dressed in a necktie.
Danielle is a chicken who is almost always seen with her favorite food, pretzels.
Gordy (performed by Timothy Doner) is a male bird that is green and yellow and learns new words. He is the town shouter. He is two years old.

Guest stars
Rosie Perez, Mary Testa, and Sandra Bernhard made guest appearances on the show.

Episodes
Three specials and a pilot episode were produced.

Pilot (2003)

Season 1 (2004)

Release
Whoopi's Littleburg was first announced at Nickelodeon's upfront presentation on March 24, 2003. In June, it joined the channel's 2004–05 programming slate. It was advertised as a series of specials. Episodes were aired sporadically throughout 2004, with reruns shown once weekly. During its run, VITAC representatives deemed Littleburg "educational enough" to receive free closed captioning and subtitling. In 2006, the series' soundtrack was released to Nick Jr. Radio, a webcasting station featuring songs from preschool-oriented programs.

Reception
The miniseries received positive reviews from critics, many of which praised its music and appeal towards multiple age groups. The Hollywood Reporters Marilyn Moss stated that Whoopi's Littleburg was "a lively and educational adventure into a friendly television space" and that the series was "likely to attract a wide audience."  Writing for The New York Times, Kathryn Shattuck called the series a "saga of empowerment" and dubbed the series' songs "fanciful." Lynne Heffley of the Los Angeles Times praised the show's music, saying that it "is a standout component, woven deftly throughout." In his review for The Christian Science Monitor, M.S. Mason noted that "this amusing, sweet-natured show for tiny tots will earn kudos from parents as well. Whoopi Goldberg has a wonderful ability to make kids giggle with the aid of puppets." Jacqueline Cutler of the Hays Daily News lauded Goldberg's performance in particular and felt that "Goldberg emanates no-nonsense warmth. When she talks to the puppets, she neither camps it up or talks down, and that even approach makes the show work."

References

External links

 
 Whoopi's Littleburg at TV Guide
 Whoopi's Littleburg at Moviefone

English-language television shows
Treehouse TV original programming
2000s Nickelodeon original programming
Nick Jr. original programming
American children's musical television series
American preschool education television series
American television shows featuring puppetry
2000s preschool education television series
2004 American television series debuts
2004 American television series endings
2000s American children's television series
2000s American music television series
2000s American television miniseries
Television series about cats
Television series about chickens
Television series about horses
Television series about pigs
Television series about children